The Order of Assassins or simply the Assassins  were a Nizārī Ismāʿīlī order and sect of Shīʿa Islam that existed between 1090 and 1275 CE. During that time, they lived in the mountains of Persia and in Syria, and held a strict subterfuge policy throughout the Middle East through the covert murder of Muslim and Christian leaders who were considered enemies of the Nizārī Ismāʿīlī State. The modern term assassination is believed to stem from the tactics used by the Assassins.

Nizārī Ismāʿīlīsm formed in the late 11th century after a succession crisis within the Fatimid Caliphate between Nizār ibn al-Mustanṣir and his half-brother, caliph al-Musta‘lī. Contemporaneous historians include Arabs ibn al-Qalanisi and Ali ibn al-Athir, and the Persian Ata-Malik Juvayni. The first two referred to the Assassins as batiniyya, an epithet widely accepted by Ismāʿīlīs themselves.

Overview
The Nizari Isma'ili State, later known as the Assassins, was founded by Hassan-i Sabbah. The state was formed in 1090 after the capture of Alamut Castle in modern Iran, which served as the Assassins' headquarters. The Alamut and Lambsar castles became the foundation of a network of Isma'ili fortresses throughout Persia and Syria that formed the backbone of Assassin power, and included Syrian strongholds at Masyaf, Abu Qubays, al-Qadmus and al-Kahf. The Nizari Isma'ili State was ruled by Hassan-i Sabbah until his death in 1124. The Western world was introduced to the Assassins by the works of Marco Polo who understood the name as deriving from the word hashish.

The rulers of the Nizari Isma'ili State were religious leaders, at first da'i and later Imams. Prominent Assassin leaders operating in Syria included al-Hakim al-Munajjim, the physician-astrologer (d. 1103), Abu Tahir al-Sa’igh, the goldsmith (d. 1113), Bahram al-Da'i (d. 1127), and Rashid ad-Din Sinan, renowned as the greatest Assassin chief (d. 1193).
While Assassins typically refers to the entire sect, only a group of disciples known as the fida'i actually engaged in conflict. Lacking their own army, the Nizari relied on these warriors to carry out espionage and assassinations of key enemy figures. The preferred method of killing was by dagger, nerve poison or arrows. The Assassins posed a substantial strategic threat to Fatimid, Abbasid, and Seljuk authority. Over the course of nearly 300 years, they killed hundreds – including three caliphs, a ruler of Jerusalem and several Muslim and Christian leaders. The first instance of murder in the effort to establish a Nizari Isma'ili state in Persia was the assassination of Seljuk vizier Nizam al-Mulk in 1092.

Other notable victims of the Assassins include Janah ad-Dawla, emir of Homs, (1103), Mawdud ibn Altuntash, atabeg of Mosul (1113), Fatimid vizier Al-Afdal Shahanshah (1121), Seljuk atabeg Aqsunqur al-Bursuqi (1126), Fatimid caliph al-Amir bi-Ahkami’l-Lah (1130), Taj al-Mulk Buri, atabeg of Damascus (1132), and Abbasid caliphs al-Mustarshid (1135) and ar-Rashid (1138). Saladin, a major foe of the Assassins, escaped assassination twice (1175–1176). The first Frank known to have been killed by the Assassins was Raymond II, Count of Tripoli, in 1152. The Assassins were acknowledged and feared by the Crusaders, losing the de facto King of Jerusalem, Conrad of Montferrat, to an Assassin's blade in 1192 and Lord Philip of Montfort of Tyre in 1270.

During the rule of Imam Rukn al-Din Khurshah, the Nizari Isma'ili State declined internally, and was eventually destroyed as Khurshah surrendered the castles after the Mongol invasion of Persia. Khurshah died in 1256 and, by 1275, the Mongols had destroyed and eliminated the order of Assassins.

Accounts of the Assassins were preserved within Western, Arabic, Syriac, and Persian sources where they are depicted as trained killers, responsible for the systematic elimination of opposing figures. European orientalists in the 19th and 20th centuries also referred to the Isma'ili Assassins in their works, writing about them based on accounts in seminal works by medieval Sunni Arab and Persian authors, particularly ibn al-Qalanisi's Mudhayyal Ta'rikh Dimashq (Continuation of the Chronicle of Damascus), ibn al-Athir's al-Kāmil fit-Tārīkh (The Complete History), and Juvayni's Tarīkh-i Jahān-gushā (History of the World Conqueror).

Origins

Hassan-i Sabbah was born in Qom, ca. 1050, and did his religious studies in Cairo with the Fatimids. Sabbah's father was a Qahtanite Arab, said to be a descendant of Himyaritic kings, having emigrated to Qom from Kufa. His support of Nizar ibn al-Mustansir in the succession crisis resulted in his imprisonment and deportation. He made his way to Persia where, through subterfuge, he and his followers captured Alamut Castle in 1090. This was the beginning of the Nizari Isma'ili State and the Assassins. Hassan-i Sabbah was not a direct descendant of Nizar and so a da'i rather than an Imam. It was Isma'ili doctrine that he kept Nizar's lineage intact through the so-called "concealed Imams". Sabbah adapted the fortress to suit his needs not only for defense from hostile forces, but also for indoctrination of his followers. After laying claim to the fortress at Alamut, Sabbah began expanding his influence outwards to nearby towns and districts, using his agents to gain political favour and to intimidate the local populations. Spending most of his days at Alamut producing religious works and developing doctrines for his order, Sabbah would never again leave his fortress. Murder for religious purposes was not new to the region, as the strangler sects of southern Iraq dating to the eighth century have shown. The strangler sects were stopped by the Umayyads; the Assassins would not be by the later caliphates.

Shortly after establishing their headquarters at Alamut Castle, the sect captured Lambsar Castle, to be the largest of the Isma'ili fortresses and confirming the Assassins' power in northern Persia. The estimated date of the capture of Lambsar varies between 1096 and 1102. The castle was taken under the command of Kiya Buzurg Ummid, later Sabbah's successor, who remained commandant of the fortress for twenty years. No interactions between the Christian forces of the First Crusade and the Assassins have been noted, with the latter concentrating on the Muslim enemies of the former. Other than a mention of Tancred's 1106 taking of Apamea (see below) in Gesta Tancredi, Western Europe likely first learned of the Assassins from the chronicles of William of Tyre, A History of Deeds Done Beyond the Sea, published much later. William coined the phrase "Old Man of the Mountain" to describe the Nizari Isma'ili da'i at Alamut.

The Assassins were immediately threatened by the forces of Seljuk sultan Malik-Shah I, marking the beginning of the Nizari-Seljuk wars. One of Sabbah's disciples named Dihdar Bu-Ali from Qazvin rallied local supporters to deflect the Seljuks. Their attack on Alamut Castle and surrounding areas was canceled upon the death of the sultan. The new sultan Barkiyaruq, son of Malik-Shah I, did not continue the direct attack on Alamut, concentrating on securing his position against rivals, including his half-brother Muhammad I Tapar, who eventually settled for a smaller role, becoming malik (translated as "king") in Armenia and Azerbaijan.

The first notable assassination was that of powerful Seljuk vizier Nizam al-Mulk in 1092, who had helped propel Barkiyaruq to lead the sultanate. Sabbah is reputed to have remarked, "the killing of this devil is the beginning of bliss" on hearing to the death of Nizam. Of the 50 assassinations conducted during Sabbah's reign, more than half were Seljuk officials, many of whom supported Muhammad I Tapar. The story (presented here) claiming a friendship among Nizam al-Mulk, Hassan-i Sabbah and Omar Khayyam described by Edward FitzGerald in his translation of The Rubaiyat of Omar Khayyam is most certainly false.

The Assassins seized Persian castles of Rudkhan and Gerdkuh in 1096, before turning to Syria. Gerdkuh was re-fortified by Mu'ayyad al-Din Muzaffar ibn Ahmad Mustawfi, a Seljuk who was a secret Isma'ili convert, and his son Sharaf al-Din Muhammad. There they occupied the fortress at Shaizar held by the Banu Munqidh, using it to spread terror to Isfahan, the heart of the Seljuk Empire. A rebellion by the local population drove the Assassins out, but they continued to occupy a smaller fortress at Khalinjan. In 1097, Barkiyaruq associate Bursuq was killed by Assassins.

By 1100, Barkiyaruq had consolidated his power, and the Assassins increased their presence by infiltrating the sultan's court and army. Day-to-day functions of the court were frequently performed while armored and with weapons. The next year, he tasked his brother Ahmad Sanjar, then ruler of Khorasan, to attack Assassin strongholds in Quhistan. The siege at Tabas was at first successful, with the walls of the fortress breached, but then was lifted, possibly because the Seljuk commander had been bribed. The subsequent attack was devastating to the Assassins, but the terms granted were generous and they were soon reestablished at both Quhistan and Tabas. In the years following, the Assassins continued their mission against religious and secular leaders. Given these successes, they began expanding their operations into Syria.

Expansion into Syria
The first da'i Hassan-i dispatched to Syria was al-Hakim al-Munajjim, a Persian known as the physician-astrologer, establishing a cell in Aleppo in the early 12th century. Ridwan, the emir of Aleppo, was in search of allies and worked closely with al-Hakim leading to speculation that Ridwan himself was a Nizari. The alliance was first shown in the assassination in 1103 of Janah ad-Dawla, emir of Homs and a key opponent of Ridwan. He was murdered by three Assassins at the Great Mosque of al-Nuri in Homs. Al-Hakim died a few weeks later and was succeeded by Abu Tahir al-Sa’igh, a Persian known as the goldsmith.

After the death of Barkiyaruq in 1105, his successor Muhammad I Tapar began his anti-Nizari campaign. While successful in cleaning the Assassins out of parts of Persia, they remained untouchable in their strongholds in the north. An eight-year war of attrition was initiated under the command of Ahmad ibn Nizam al-Mulk, the son of the first Assassin victim. The mission had some successes, negotiating a surrender of Khalinjan with local Assassin leader Ahmad ibn 'Abd al-Malik ibn Attāsh, with the occupants allowed to go to Tabas and Arrajan. But ibn Nizam al-Mulk was unable to take Alamut Castle and avenge the deaths of his father and brother Fakhr al-Mulk. During the siege of Alamut, a famine resulted and Hassan had his wife and daughters sent to the fortress at Gerdkuh. After that time, Assassins never allowed their women to be at their fortresses during military campaigns, both for protection and secrecy. In the end, ibn Attāsh did not fulfill his commitment and was flayed alive, his head delivered to the sultan.

In Syria, Abu Tahir al-Sa’igh, Ridwan and Abu'l Fath of Sarmin conspired in 1106 to send a team of Assassins to murder Khalaf ibn Mula'ib, emir of Apamea (Qalaat al-Madiq). Some of Khalaf's sons and guards were also killed and, after the murder, Ridwan became overlord of Apamea and its fortress Qal'at al-Madiq, with Abu'l Fath as emir. A surviving son of Khalaf escaped and turned to Tancred, who was at first content to leave the city in the hands of the Isma'ilis and simply collect tribute. Later, he returned and captured the city for Antioch, as the town's residents overwhelmingly approved of Frankish rule. Abu'l Fath was tortured to death, while Abu Tahir ransomed himself and returned to Aleppo. This encounter, the first between the Crusaders and the Assassins, did not deter the latter from their prime mission against the Seljuks.

Some time later, after 1108, Ahmad ibn Nizam al-Mulk himself was attacked by Assassins for revenge but survived. Not so lucky were Ubayd Allah al-Khatib, qadi of Isfahan, and a qadi of Nishapur, both of whom succumbed to the Assassins' blade.

The Assassins wreaked havoc on the Syrian rulers, with their first major kill being that of Mawdud, atabeg of Mosul, in 1113. Mawdud was felled by Assassins in Damascus while a guest of Toghtekin, atabeg of Damascus. He was replaced at Mosul by al-Bursuqi, who himself would be a victim of the Assassins in 1126. Toghtekin's son, the great Buri, founder of the Burid dynasty, would fall victim to the Assassins in 1131, dying a year later due to his injuries.

Ridwan died in 1113 and was succeeded as ruler of Aleppo by his son Alp Arslan al-Akhras. Alp Arslan continued his father's conciliatory approach to the Assassins. A warning from Muhammad I Tapar and a prior attempt of the assassination of Abu Harb Isa ibn Zayd, a wealthy Persian merchant, led to a wholescale expulsion of the Assassins from Aleppo in that same year. Led by militia commander Sāʿid ibn Badī, the attack resulted in the execution of Abu Tahir al-Sa’igh and the brother of al-Hakim al-Munajjim, with 200 other Assassins killed or imprisoned, some thrown from the top of the citadel. Many took refuge with the Banu Munqidh at Shaizar. Revenge was slow but sure, taken out on Sāʿid ibn Badī in 1119. The shiftless Arp Arslan had exiled Sāʿid to Qalʿat Jaʿbar, where he was murdered along with two of his sons by Assassins.

The Assassins struck again in Damascus in 1116. While a guest of Toghtekin's, Kurdish emir Ahmad-Il ibn Ibrāhim ibn Wahsūdān was sitting next to his host when a grieving man approached with a petition he wished be conveyed to Muhammad I Tapar. When Ahmad-Il accepted the document, he was stuck with a dagger, then again and again by a second and third accomplice. It was thought that the real target may have Toghtekin, but the attackers were discovered to be Assassins, likely after Ahmad-Il, the foster brother of sultan.

In 1118, Muhammad I Tapar died and his brother Ahmad Sanjar became Seljuk sultan, and Hassan sent ambassadors to seek peace. When Sanjar rebuffed these ambassadors, Hassan then sent his Assassins to the sultan. Sanjar woke up one morning with a dagger stuck in the ground beside his bed. Alarmed, he kept the matter a secret. A messenger from Hassan arrived and stated, "Did I not wish the sultan well that the dagger which was struck in the hard ground would have been planted on your soft breast". For the next several decades there ensued a ceasefire between the Isma'ilis and the Seljuks. Sanjar himself pensioned the Assassins on taxes collected from the lands they owned, gave them grants and licenses, and even allowed them to collect tolls from travelers.

By 1120, the Assassins position in Aleppo had improved to the point that they demanded the small citadel of Qal'at ash-Sharif from Ilghazi, then Artuqid emir of Aleppo. Rather than refuse, he had the citadel demolished. The end of Assassin influence in Aleppo ended in 1124 when they were expelled by Belek Ghazi, a successor to Ilghazi. Nevertheless, the qadi ibn al-Khashahab who had overseen the demolition of Qal'at ash-Sharif was killed by Assassins in 1125. At the same time, the Assassins of Diyarbakir were set upon by the locals, resulting in hundreds killed.

No one was more responsible for the succession crisis that caused the exile of Nizar ibn Mustarstir than the powerful Fatimid vizier al-Afdal Shahanshah. In 1121, al-Afdal was murdered by three Assassins from Aleppo, causing a seven-day celebration among the Isma'ilis and no great mourning among the court of Fatimid caliph al-Amir bi-Ahkam Allah who resented his growing boldness. Al-Afdal Shahanshah was replaced as vizier by al-Ma'mum al-Bata'ihi who was instructed to prepare a letter of rapprochement between Cairo and Alamut. Upon learning of a plot to kill both al-Amir and al-Ma'mum, such ideas were disbanded, and severe restrictions on dealing with the Assassins were instead put in place.

The next generation

In 1124, Hassan-i Sabbah died, leaving a legacy that reverberated throughout the Middle East for centuries. He was succeeded at Alamut by Kiya Buzurg Ummid.

The appointment of a new da'i at Alamut may have led the Seljuks to believe the Assassins were in a weakened position, and Ahmad Sanjar launched an attack on them in 1126. Led by Sanjar's vizier Mu'in ad-Din Kashi, the Seljuks again struck at Quhistan and also Nishapur in the east, and at Rudbar to the north. In the east, the Seljuks had minor successes at a village near Sabzevar, where the population was destroyed, their leader leaping from the mosque's minaret, and at Turaythirth in Nishapur, where the attackers "killed many, took much booty, and then returned." At best, the results were not decisive, but superior to the routing the Seljuks received in the north, with one expedition driven back, losing their previous booty, and another having a Seljuk commander captured. In the end, the Isma'ili position was better than before the offensive. In the guise of a peace offering of two Arabian horses, Assassins gained the confidence of Mu'in ad-Din Kashi and killed him in 1127.

At the same time, in Syria, a Persian named Bahram al-Da'i, the successor to Abu Tahir al-Sa’igh who had been executed in Aleppo in 1113, appeared in Damascus reflecting cooperation between the Assassins and Toghtekin, including a joint operation against the Crusaders. Bahram, a Persian from Asterabad (present-day Gorgan), had lived in secrecy after the expulsion of the Assassins from Aleppo and was the nephew of an Assassin Abu Ibrahim al-Asterbadi who had been executed by Barkiyaruq in 1101. Bahram was most likely behind the murder of al-Bursuqi in 1126, whose assassination may have been ordered by the Seljuk sultan Mahmud II. He later established a stronghold near Banias. During an attack on the Lebanese valley of Wadi al-Taym, Bahram captured and tortured to death a local chieftain named Baraq ibn Jandal. In retaliation, his brother Dahhak ibn Jandal killed Bahram in 1127. So great was the fear and hatred of the Assassins that the messenger delivering Bahram's head and hands to Cairo was rewarded with a robe of honor. That fear was justified as caliph al-Amir bi-Ahkam Allah was murdered at court in 1130 by ten Assassins.

The Isma'ili response to the Seljuk invasion of 1126 was multi-faceted. In Rudbar, a new and powerful fortress was built at Maymundiz and new territories acquired. To the east, the Seljuk stronghold of Sistan was raided in 1129. That same year, Mahmud II, son of Muhammad I Tapar, and sultan of Isfahan, decided to sue for peace with Alamut. Unfortunately, the Isma'ili envoys to Mahmud II were lynched by an angry mob following their audience with the sultan. The demand by Kiya Buzurg Ummid for punishment of the perpetrators was refused. That prompted an Assassin attack on Qazvin, resulting in the loss of 400 lives in addition to a Turkish emir. A counterattack on Alamut was inconclusive.

In Syria, Assassin leader Bahram was replaced by another mysterious Persian named Isma'il al-'Ajami who, like Bahram, was supported by al-Mazdaghani, the pro-Isma'ili vizier to Toghtekin. After the death of Toghtekin in 1128, his son and successor Taj a-Mulk Buri began to free Damascus of Assassins. Supported by his military commander Yusuf ibn Firuz, al-Mazdaghani was murdered and his head publicly displayed. The Damascenes turned on the Assassins leaving "dogs yelping and quarreling over their limbs and corpses." At least 6000 Assassins died, and the rest, including Isma'il (who had turned Banias over to the Franks), fled to Frankish territory. Isma'il was killed in 1130, temporarily disabling the Assassins' Syrian mission. Nevertheless, Alamut organized a counterstrike, with two Persian Assassins disguised as Turkish soldiers who struck down Buri in 1131. The Assassins were hacked to pieces by Buri's guards, and he died of his wounds the following year.

Mahmud II died in 1131 and his brother Ghiyath ad-Din Mas'ud (Mas'ud) was recognized as successor by Abbasid caliph al-Mustarshid. The succession was contested by Mahmud's son and other brothers, and al-Mustarshid was draw into the conflict. The caliph al-Mustarshid was taken prisoner by Seljuk forces in 1135 near Hamadan and pardoned with the proviso that he abdicate. Left in his tent studying the Quran, he was murdered by a large group of Assassins. Some suspected Mas'ud and even Ahmad Sanjar with complicity, but the chronicles of contemporaneous Arab historians ibn al-Athir and ibn al-Jawzi do not bear that out. The Isma'ilis commemorated the caliph's death with seven days and nights of celebration.

The reign of Buzurg Ummid ended with his death in 1138, showing a relatively small list of assassinations. He was succeeded by his son Muhammad Buzurg Ummid, sometimes referred to as Kiya Muhammad.

The Abbasids' celebration of the death of the Assassin leader Buzurg Ummid was short-lived. The son and successor of the last high-profile victim of the Assassins, al-Mustarshid, was ar-Rashid. Ar-Rashid was deposed by his uncle al-Muqtafi in 1136 and, while recovering from an illness in Isfahan, was murdered by Assassins. The addition of a second caliph to the Assassins' so-called "role of honor" of victims again resulted in a week of celebration at Alamut. Another significant success was the assassination of the son of Mahmud II, Da'ud, who ruled in Azerbaijan and Jibal. Da'ud was felled by four Assassins in Tabriz in 1143, rumored to have been dispatched by Zengi, atabeg of Mosul.

The decades after the assassination of al-Mustarshid showed an expansion of Assassin castles in Jabal Bahrā', to the northwest of their Syrian fortresses in Jabal as-Summaq. In 1132, Saif al-Mulk ibn Amrun, emir of al-Kahf, recovered the fortress of al-Qadmus from the Franks, known to them as Bokabeis. He then sold the fortress to the Assassins in 1133. This was followed by the ceding of al-Kahf Castle itself to Assassin control in 1138 by Saif's son Musa in the midst of a succession struggle. These were followed by the acquisition of the castle at Masyaf in 1140 and of Qala'at al-Khawabi, known to the Crusaders as La Coible, in 1141.

Relatively little is recorded concerning Assassin activity during this period until the Second Crusade. In 1149, an Assassin named Ali ibn-Wafa allied with Raymond of Poitiers, son of William IX of Aquitaine, to defend the borders of the Principality of Antioch against Zengid expansion. The forces met at the battle of Inab, with Zengi's son and heir Nur ad-Din defeating the Franks, killing both Raymond and ibn-Wafa. Nur ad-Din would again foil the Assassins in 1158, incorporating a castle at Shaizar that they had occupied after the 1157 earthquake into his territory. Two assassinations are known from this period. In a revenge attack, Dahhak ibn Jandal, the Wadi al-Taym chieftain who had killed Assassin da'i Bahram in 1127, died from an Assassin's blade in 1149. A few years later in 1152, possibly in retaliation to the establishment of the Knights Templar at Tartus, Raymond II, count of Tripoli, was killed by Assassins. This marked the first known Christian victim.

Hassan II and Rashid ad-Din Sinan

The fourteen known assassinations during the reign of Kiya Muhammad was a far cry from the tally of his predecessors, representing a significant decline in the power of the Isma'ilis. This was exemplified by the governors of Mazandaran and of Rayy who were said to have built towers out of Isma'ili skulls. That was to change with the ascension in 1162 of Ḥasan ʿAlā Zikrihi's Salām, known as Hassan II, the first to be recognized as Imam.

In the middle of Ramadan in 559 AH, Hassan II gathered his followers  and announced to "jinn, men and angels" that the Hidden Imam had freed them "from the burden of the rules of Holy Law". With that, the assembled took part in a ritual violation of Sharia, a banquet with wine, in violation of the Ramadan fast, with their backs turned towards Medina. Observance of Islamic rites (fasting, salat prayer, etc.) was punishable by the utmost severity. (According to Shīʿa hadiths, when the Hidden Imam/mahdi reappears, "he will bring a new religion, a new book and a new law").
Resistance was nonetheless deep, and Hasan was stabbed to death by his own brother-in-law.

Hassan II shifted the focus of his followers from the exoteric to the esoteric (batin). He traced his genealogy to the Fatimid Imams and Imam Nizar, which the da'is of Alamut confirmed as they were the ones in contact with the Imam. He abrogated the exoteric practice of Sharia and stressed on the esoteric (batini) side of the laws. And "while outwardly he was known as the grandson of Buzurgumid", in this esoteric reality, Lewis writes, Hasan claimed "he was the Imam of the time" (the last Imam of Shia Islam before the end of the world). The impact of these changes on Isma'ili life and politics were vast and continued after Hassan II's death in 1166 by his son Nūr al-Dīn Muhammad, known as the Imam Muhammad II, who ruled from 1166 to 1210. It is in this context and the changes in the Muslim world brought about by the disintegration of the Seljuk empire that a new chief da'i of the Assassins was thrust: Rashid ad-Din Sinan, referred to as Sinān

Rashid ad-Din Sinan, an alchemist and schoolmaster, was dispatched to Syria by Hassan II as a messenger of his Islamic views and to continue the Assassins' mission. Known as the greatest of the Assassin chiefs, Sinān first made headquarters at al-Kahf Castle and then the fortress of Masyaf. At al-Kahf, he worked with chief da'i Abu-Muhammad who was succeeded at his death by Khwaja Ali ibn Mas'ud without authority from Alamut. Khwaja was murdered by Abu-Muhammad's nephew Abu Mansur, causing Alamut to reassert control. After seven years at al-Kahf, Sinān assumed that role, operating independently of and feared by Alamut, relocating the capital to Masyaf. Among his first tasks were the refurbishing of the fortress of ar-Rusafa and of Qala'at al-Khawabi, constructing a tower at the citadel of the latter. Sinān also captured the castle of al-'Ullaiqah at Aleika, near Tartus.

One of the first orders of business that Sinān confronted was the continuing threat from Nur ad-Din as well as the Knights Templar's presence at Tartus. In 1173, Sinān proposed to Amalric of Jerusalem an alliance against Nur ad-Din in exchange for cancellation of the tribute imposed upon Assassin villages near Tartus. The Assassin envoys to the king were ambushed and slain returning from their negotiations near Tripoli by a Templar knight named Walter du Mesnil, an act apparently sanctioned by the Grand Master Odo de Saint Amand. Amalric demanded the knight be surrendered, but Odo refused, claiming only the pope had the authority to punish du Mesnil. Amalric had du Mesnil kidnapped and imprisoned at Tyre. Sinān accepted the king's apology, assured that justice had been done. The point of the alliance became moot as both Nur ad-Din and Amalric died of natural causes soon thereafter.

These developments could not have been better for Saladin who wished to expand beyond Egypt into Jerusalem and Syria, first taking Damascus. With the Kingdom of Jerusalem being led by the 13-year old leperous Baldwin IV and Syria by the 11-year old as-Salih Ismail al-Malik, son of Nur ad-Din, he continued his campaign in Syria, moving against Aleppo. While besieging Aleppo in late 1174 or early 1175, the camp of Saladin was infiltrated by Assassins sent by Sinān and As-Salih's regent Gümüshtigin. Nasih al-Din Khumartekin, emir of Abu Qubays, was killed in the attack which left Saladin unscathed. The next year, after taking Azaz, Assassins again struck, wounding Saladin. Gümüshtigin was again believed to be complicit in the assassination attempt. Turning his attention to Aleppo, the city was soon conquered and Saladin allowed as-Salih and Gümüshtigin to continue to rule, but under his sovereignty. Saladin then turned his attention back to the Assassins, besieging Masyaf in 1176. Failing to capture the stronghold, he settled for a truce. Accounts of a mystical encounter between Saladin and Sinān have been offered :

Saladin had his guards supplied with link lights and had chalk and cinders strewed around his tent outside Masyaf—which he was besieging—to detect any footsteps by the Assassins. According to this version, one night Saladin's guards noticed a spark glowing down the hill of Masyaf and then vanishing among the Ayyubid tents. Presently, Saladin awoke to find a figure leaving the tent. He saw that the lamps were displaced and beside his bed laid hot scones of the shape peculiar to the Assassins with a note at the top pinned by a poisoned dagger. The note threatened that he would be killed if he did not withdraw from his assault. Saladin gave a loud cry, exclaiming that Sinan himself was the figure that had left the tent.

Another version claims that Saladin hastily withdrew his troops from Masyaf because they were urgently needed to fend off a Crusader force in the vicinity of Mount Lebanon. In reality, Saladin sought to form an alliance with Sinan and his Assassins, consequently depriving the Crusaders of a potent ally against him. Viewing the expulsion of the Crusaders as a mutual benefit and priority, Saladin and Sinan maintained cooperative relations afterwards, the latter dispatching contingents of his forces to bolster Saladin's army in a number of decisive subsequent battlefronts.

By 1177, The conflict between Sinān and as-Salih continued with the assassination of Shihab ad-Din abu-Salih, vizier to both as-Salih and Nur ad-Din. A letter from as-Salih to Sinān requesting the murder was found to be a forgery by Gümüshtigin, causing his removal. As-Salih seized the village of al-Hajira from the Assassins, and in response Sinān's followers burned the marketplace in Aleppo.

In 1190, Isabella I was Queen of Jerusalem and the Third Crusade had just begun. The daughter of Amalric, she married her first husband Conrad of Montferrat, who became king by virtue of marriage, not yet crowned. Conrad was of royal blood, the cousin of Holy Roman Emperor Frederick Barbarossa and Louis VII of France. Conrad had been in charge of Tyre during the siege of Tyre in 1187 launched by Saladin, successfully defending the city. Guy of Lusignan, married to Isabella's half-sister Sybilla of Jerusalem, was king of Jerusalem by right of marriage and had been captured by Saladin during the battle of Hattin in that same year, 1187. When Guy was released in 1188, he was denied entry to Tyre by Conrad and launched the siege of Acre in 1189. Queen Sybilla died of an epidemic sweeping her husband's military camp in 1190, negating Guy's claim to the throne and resulting in Isabella becoming queen.

Assassins disguised as Christian monks had infiltrated the bishopric of Tyre, gaining the confidence of both the archbishop Joscius and Conrad of Montferrat. There in 1192, they stabbed Conrad to death. The surviving Assassin is reputed to have named Richard I of England as the instigator, who had much to gain as demonstrated by the rapidity at which the widow married Henry II of Champagne. That account is disputed by ibn al-Athir who names Saladin in a plot with Sinān to kill both Conrad and Richard. Richard I was captured by Leopold V, Duke of Austria, and held by Henry VI, who had become Holy Roman Emperor in 1191, accused of murder. Sinān wrote to Leopold V absolving Richard I of complicity in the plot. Regardless, Richard I was released in 1194 after England paid his ransom and the murder remains unsolved. Adding to the continued cold case is the belief by modern historians that Sinan's letter to Leopold V is a forgery, written by members of Richard I's administration.

Conrad was Sinān's last assassination. The great Assassin Rashid ad-Din Sinan, the Old Man of the Mountain, died in 1193, the same year that claimed Saladin. He died of natural causes at al-Kahf Castle and was buried at Salamiyah, which had been a secret hub of Isma'ili activity in the 9th and 10th centuries. His successor was Nasr al-'Ajami, under the control of Alamut, who reportedly met with emperor Henry VI in 1194. Later successors through 1227 included Kamāl ad-Din al-Hasan and Majd ad-Din, again under the control of Alamut. Saladin left his Ayyubid dynasty under his sons al-Aziz Uthman, sultan of Egypt, al-Afdal ibn Salah ad-Din, emir of Damascus, and az-Zahir Ghazi, emir of Aleppo. Al-Aziz died soon thereafter, replaced by Saladin's brother al-Adil I.

13th century

In 1210, Muhammad III died and his son Jalāl al-Din Hasan (known as Hassan III) became Imam of the Nizari Isma'ili State. His first actions included the return to the Islamic orthodoxy by practising Taqiyyah to ensure safety of the Ismailis in the hostile environment. He claimed allegiance to the Sunnis to protect himself and his followers from further persecution. He had a Sunni mother and four Sunni wives. Hassan III recognized the Abbasid caliph al-Nasir who in turn granted a diploma of investiture. The Alamuts had a previous history with al-Nasir, supplying Assassins to attack a Kwarezm representative of shah Ala ad-Din Tekish, but that was more of an action of convenience than formal alliance. Maintaining ties to western Christian influences, the Alamuts became tributaries to the Knights Hospitaller beginning at the Isma'ili stronghold Abu Qubays, near Margat.

The count of Tripoli in 1213 was Bohemond IV, the fourth prince of Antioch of that name. That year his 18-year-old son Raymond, namesake of his grandfather, was murdered by the Assassins under Nasr al-'Ajami while at church in Tartus. Suspecting both Assassin and Hospitaller involvement, Bohemond and the Knights Templar laid siege to Qala'at al-Khawabi, an Isma'ili stronghold near Tartus, Appealing to the Ayyubids for help, az-Zahir Ghazi dispatched a relief force from Aleppo. His forces were nearly destroyed at Jabal Bahra. Az-Zahir's uncle al-Adil I, emir of Damascus, responded and the Franks ended the siege by 1216. Bohemond IV would again fight the Ayyudibs in the Fifth Crusade.

Majd ad-Din was the new chief da'i in Syria in 1220, assuming that role from Kamāl ad-Din al-Hasan of whom very little is known. At that time the Seljuk sultanate of Rûm paid an annual tribute to Alamut, and Majd ad-Din notified the sultan Kayqubad I that henceforth the tribute was to be paid to him. Kayqubad I requested clarification from Hassan III who informed him that the monies had indeed been assigned to Syria.

Hassan III died in 1221, likely from poisoning. He was succeeded by his 9-year-old son Imam 'Alā ad-Din Muhammad, known as Muhammad III, and was the penultimate Isma'ili ruler of Alamut before the Mongol conquest. Because of his age, Hassan's vizier served as regent to the young Imam, and put Hassan's wives and sister to death for the suspected poisoning. Muhammad III reversed the Sunni course his father had set, returning to Shi'ite orthodoxy. His attempts to accommodate the advancing Mongols failed.

In 1225, Frederick II was Holy Roman Emperor, a position his father Henry VI had held until 1197. He had committed to prosecuting the Sixth Crusade and married the heiress to the Kingdom of Jerusalem, Isabella II. The next year, the once and future king sent envoys to Majd ad-Din with significant gifts for the imam to ensure his safe passage. Khwarezm had collapsed under the Mongols, but many of the Kwarezmians still operated as mercenaries in northern Iraq. Under the pretense that the road to Alamut was unsafe due to these mercenaries, Majd ad-Din kept the gifts for himself, and provided the safe passage. As a precaution, Majd ad-Din informed al-Aziz Muhammad, emir of Aleppo and son of az-Zahir Ghazi, of the emperor's embassy. In the end, Frederick did not complete that trip to the Holy Land due to illness, being excommunicated in 1227. The Knights Hospitaller were not as accommodating as Alamut, demanding their share of the tribute. When Majd ad-Din refused, the Hospitallers attacked and carried off the majority of the booty. Majd ad-Din was succeeded by Sirāj ad-Din Muzaffa ibn al-Husain in 1227, serving as chief da'i until 1239.

Taj ad-Din Abu'l-Futūh ibn Muhammad was chief da'i in Syria in 1239, succeeding Sirāj ad-Din Muzaffa. At this point, the Assassins were an integral part of Syrian politics. The Arab historian Ibn Wasil had a friendship with Taj ad-Din and writes of Badr ad-Din, qadi of Sinjar, who sought refuge with Taj ad-Din to escape the wrath of Egyptian Ayyubid ruler as-Salih Ayyub. Taj ad-Din served until at least 1249 when he was replaced by Radi ad-Din Abu'l-Ma'āli.

In that same year, Louis IX of France embarked on the Seventh Crusade in Egypt. He captured the port of Damietta from the aging al-Salih Ayyub which he refused to turn over to Conrad II, who had inherited the throne of Jerusalem from his parents Frederick II and Isabella II. The Frankish Crusaders were soundly defeated by Abu Futuh Baibars, then a commander in the Egyptian army, at the battle of al-Mansurah in 1250. Saint Louis, as Louis IX was known, was captured by the Egyptians and, after a handsome reward was paid, spent four years in Acre, Caesarea and Jaffa. One of the captives with Louis was Jean de Joinville, biographer of the king, who reported the interaction of the monarch with the Assassins. While at Acre, emissaries of Radi ad-Din Abu'l-Ma'āli met with him, demanding a tribute be paid to their chief "as the emperor of Germany, the king of Hungary, the sultan of Egypt and the others because they know well they can only live as long as it please him." Alternately, the king could pay the tribute the Assassins paid the Templars and Hospitallers. Later the king's Arabic interpreter Yves the Breton met personally with Radi ad-Din and discussed the respective beliefs. Afterwards, the chief da'i went riding, with his valet proclaiming: "Make way before him who bears the death of kings in his hands!"

The Egyptian victory at al-Mansurah led to the establishment of the Mamluk dynasty in Egypt. Muhammad III was murdered in 1255 and replaced by his son Rukn al-Din Khurshah, the last Imam to rule Alamut. Najm ad-Din later became chief da'i of the Assassins in Syria, the last to be associated with Alamut. Louis IX returned to north Africa during the Eighth Crusade where he died of natural causes in Tunis.

Downfall and aftermath

The Assassins suffered a significant blow at the hands of the Mongol Empire during the well-documented invasion of Khwarazm. A decree was handed over to the Mongol commander Kitbuqa who began to assault several Assassin fortresses in 1253 before Hulagu's advance in 1256, seizing Alamut late that year. Lambsar fell in 1257, Masyaf in 1267. The Assassins recaptured and held Alamut for a few months in 1275, but they were crushed and their political power was lost forever. Rukn al-Din Khurshah was put to death shortly thereafter.

Though the Mongol massacre at Alamut was widely interpreted to be the end of Isma'ili influence in the region, various sources say that the Isma'ilis' political influence continued. In 674/1275, a son of Imam Rukn al-Din Khurshah managed to recapture Alamut, though only for a few years. The Nizari Imam, known in the sources as Khudawand Muhammad, again managed to recapture the fort in the fourteenth century. It is uncertain whether "Khudawand Muhammad" refers to Muhammad Shah b. Mu'min Shah of the Muhammad Shahi line of Nizari Imams, or Islam Shah b. Qasim Shah of the Qasim Shahi line. According to Mar'ashi, the Imam's descendants would remain at Alamut until the late fifteenth century. Isma'ili political activity in the region also seems to have continued under the leadership of Sultan Muhammad b. Jahangir and his son, until the latter's execution in 1006/1597.

In Syria, the Assassins joined with other Muslim groups to oppose the Mongols and courted the Mamluks and Baibars. Baibars entered into a truce with the Hospitallers in 1266 and stipulated that the tribute paid by the Assassins be halted. The tribute once paid to the Franks was to come instead to Cairo. As early as 1260, Baibars' biographer ibn Abd al-Zahir reported that he was granting Assassin lands in [[Iqta'|iqtâ''']] to his generals, and in 1265 began to tax the "gifts" the Assassins received from various princes that apparently included Louis IX of France, Rudolph I of Germany, Alphonso X of Castile, and the Rasulid sultan of Yemen al-Muzaffar Yusuf. The Syrian branch of the Assassins was taken over by Baibars by 1270, recognizing the threat of an independent force with his sultanate.

Najm ad-Din was replaced by Baibars' son-in-law Sarim al-Din Mubarak, governor of al-'Ullaiqah in 1270. Sarim was soon deposed and sent as a prisoner to Cairo, and Najm ad-Din was restored at chief da'i at Masyaf. His son Shams ad-Din joined him in service, but owing a tribute to the sultan. The next year, in the midst of the siege of Tripoli, two Assassins were sent by Bohemond VI of Antioch, then Count of Tripoli, to murder his attacker Baibars. Shams ad-Din was arrested in the plot, but released when his father argued his case. The Isma'ili leaders were eventually implicated and agreed to surrender their castles and live at Baibars' court. Najm ad-Din died in Cairo in 1274.

In 1271, Baibars' forces seized al-'Ullaiqah and ar-Rusafa, after taking Masyaf the year before. Later in the year, Shams ad-Din surrendered and was deported to Egypt. Qala'at al-Khawabi fell that year and within two years Gerdkuh and all of the Assassin fortresses were held by the sultan. With the Assassins under his control, Baibars was able to use them to counter the forces arriving in the Ninth Crusade. The sultan threatened Bohemond VI, and the Assassins attacked future king Edward I of England unsuccessfully.

The last known victim of the Assassins was Philip of Montfort, lord of Tyre, long an enemy of Baibars. Philip helped negotiate the truce following the capture of Damietta by Louis IX and had lost the castle at Toron to Baibars in 1266. Despite his advanced age, Philip was murdered by Baibars' Assassins in 1270.

The last of the Assassin strongholds was al-Kahf in 1273. The Mamluks continued to use the services of the remaining Assassins and the 14th-century scholar ibn Battuta reported their fixed rate of pay per murder, with his children getting the fee if the Assassin did not survive the attack. There are, nevertheless, no recorded instances of Assassin activity after the later 13th century. They unremarkably settled near Salamiyah, with a still-large Isma'ili population that recognizes the Aga Khan as their Imam.

Etymology

The word asas in Arabic means "principle". The Asāsiyyūn (plural, from literary Arabic) were, as defined in Arabic, the principle people. The term "assassin" likely has roots in hashshāshīn ("hashish smokers or users"), a mispronunciation of the original Asāsiyyūn, but not a mispronunciation of Assasiyeen (pronounced "Asāsiyyeen", the plural of "Asasi"). Originally referring to the methods of political control exercised by the Assasiyuun, one can see how it became "assassin" in several languages to describe similar activities anywhere.

The Assassins were finally linked by the 19th-century orientalist Silvestre de Sacy to the Arabic word hashish using their variant names assassin and assissini in the 19th century. Citing the example of one of the first written applications of the Arabic term hashish to the Ismailis by 13th-century historian Abu Shama, de Sacy demonstrated its connection to the name given to the Ismailis throughout Western scholarship. The first known usage of the term hashishi has been traced back to 1122 when the Fatimid caliph al-Amir bi-Ahkami’l-Lah, himself later assassinated, employed it in derogatory reference to the Syrian Nizaris. Used figuratively, the term hashishi connoted meanings such as outcasts or rabble. Without actually accusing the group of using the hashish drug, the caliph used the term in a pejorative manner. This label was quickly adopted by anti-Isma'ili historians and applied to the Isma'ilis of Syria and Persia. The spread of the term was further facilitated through military encounters between the Nizaris and the Crusaders, whose chroniclers adopted the term and disseminated it across Europe. To Crusaders, the Fedayeen concept of valuing a principle above your own life was alien to them, so they rationalized it using myths such as the 'paradise legend', the 'leap of faith' legend, and the 'hashish legend', sewn together in the writings of Marco Polo.

During the medieval period, Western scholarship on the Isma'ilis contributed to the popular view of the community as a radical sect of assassins, believed to be trained for the precise murder of their adversaries. By the 14th century, European scholarship on the topic had not advanced much beyond the work and tales from the Crusaders. The origins of the word forgotten, across Europe the term assassin had taken the meaning of "professional murderer". In 1603, the first Western publication on the topic of the Assassins was authored by a court official for King Henry IV of France and was mainly based on the narratives of Marco Polo from his visits to the Near East. While he assembled the accounts of many Western travellers, the author failed to explain the etymology of the term Assassin.

According to the Lebanese writer Amin Maalouf, based on texts from Alamut, Hassan-i Sabbah tended to call his disciples Asāsīyūn (meaning "people who are faithful to the foundation [of the faith]"), and derivation from the term hashish is a misunderstanding by foreign travelers.

Another modern author, Edward Burman, states that:

The name "Assassin" is often said to derive from the Arabic word Hashishin or "users of hashish", which was originally applied to the Nizari Isma'ilis by the rival Mustali Isma'ilis during the fall of the Isma'ili Fatimid Empire and the separation of the two Isma'ili streams. There is little evidence hashish was used to motivate the Assassins, contrary to the beliefs of their Medieval enemies. It is possible that the term hashishiyya or hashishi in Arabic sources was used metaphorically in its abusive sense relating to use of hashish, which due to its effects on the mind state is outlawed in Islam. Modern versions of this word include Mahashish used in the same derogatory sense, albeit less offensive nowadays, as the use of the substance is more widespread. The term hashashin was (and still is) used to describe absent minded criminals and is used derogatorily in all the Muslim sources referring to the Nizaris as such.

Idries Shah, a Sufi scholar using Arkon Daraul as a pen name, described them as 'druggers' that used hashish "in stupefying candidates for the ephemeral visit to paradise".

Military tactics

In pursuit of their religious and political goals, the Isma'ilis adopted various military strategies popular in the Middle Ages. One such method was that of assassination, the selective elimination of prominent rival figures. The murders of political adversaries were usually carried out in public spaces, creating resounding intimidation for other possible enemies. Throughout history, many groups have resorted to assassination as a means of achieving political ends. The assassinations were committed against those whose elimination would most greatly reduce aggression against the Ismailis and, in particular, against those who had perpetrated massacres against the community. A single assassination was usually employed in contrast with the widespread bloodshed which generally resulted from factional combat. Assassins are also said to have been adept in furusiyya, or the Islamic warrior code, where they were trained in combat, disguises, and equestrianism. Codes of conduct were followed, and the Assassins were taught in the art of war, linguistics, and strategies. For about two centuries, the Assassins specialized in assassinating their religious and political enemies.

While the Seljuks and Crusaders both employed murder as a military means of disposing of factional enemies, during the Alamut period almost any murder of political significance in the Islamic lands was attributed to the Isma'ilis. So inflated had this association grown that, in the work of orientalists such as Bernard Lewis, the Isma'ilis were equated with the politically active fida'is and thus were regarded as a radical and heretical sect known as the Assassins.

The military approach of the Nizari Isma'ili state was largely a defensive one, with strategically chosen sites that appeared to avoid confrontation wherever possible without the loss of life. But the defining characteristic of the Nizari Isma'ili state was that it was scattered geographically throughout Persia and Syria. Alamut Castle therefore was only one of a nexus of strongholds throughout the regions where Isma'ilis could retreat to safety if necessary. West of Alamut in the Shahrud Valley, the major fortress of Lambsar served as just one example of such a retreat. In the context of their political uprising, the various spaces of Isma'ili military presence took on the name dar al-hijra (land of migration, place of refuge). The notion of the dar al-hijra originates from the time of Muhammad, who migrated with his followers from persecution to a safe haven in Yathrib (Medina). In this way, the Fatimids found their dar al-hijra in North Africa. From 1101 to 1118, attacks and sieges were made on the fortresses, conducted by combined forces of the Seljuks Barkiyaruq and Ahmad Sanjar. Although with the cost of lives and the capture and execution of Assassin da'i Ahmad ibn Attash, the Assassins managed to hold their ground and repel the attacks until the Mongol invasion. Likewise, during the revolt against the Seljuks, several fortresses served as spaces of refuge for the Isma'ilis.

Marco Polo recounts the following method how the Hashashin were recruited for jihad and assassinations on behalf of their master in Alamut:

“He was named Alo−eddin, and his religion was that of Mahomet. In a beautiful valley enclosed between two lofty mountains, he had formed a luxurious garden, stored with every delicious fruit and every fragrant shrub that could be procured. Palaces of various sizes and forms were erected in different parts of the grounds, ornamented with works in gold, with paintings, and with furniture of rich silks. By means of small conduits contrived in these buildings, streams of wine, milk, honey, and some of pure water, were seen to flow in every direction. The inhabitants of these palaces were elegant and beautiful damsels, accomplished in the arts of singing, playing upon all sorts of musical instruments, dancing, and especially those of dalliance and amorous allurement. Clothed in rich dresses they were seen continually sporting and amusing themselves in the garden and pavilions, their female guardians being confined within doors and never suffered to appear. The object which the chief had in view in forming a garden of this fascinating kind, was this: that Mahomet having promised to those who should obey his will the enjoyments of Paradise, where every species of sensual gratification should be found, in the society of beautiful nymphs, he was desirous of its being understood by his followers that he also was a prophet and the compeer of Mahomet, and had the power of admitting to Paradise such as he should choose to favor. In order that none without his licence might find their way into this delicious valley, he caused a strong and inexpugnable castle to be erected at the opening of it, through which the entry was by a secret passage. At his court, likewise, this chief entertained a number of youths, from the age of twelve to twenty years, selected from the inhabitants of the surrounding mountains, who showed a disposition for martial exercises, and appeared to possess the quality of daring courage. To them he was in the daily practice of discoursing on the subject of the paradise announced by the prophet, and of his own power of granting admission; and at certain times he caused opium to be administered to ten or a dozen of the youths; and when half dead with sleep he had them conveyed to the several apartments of the palaces in the garden. Upon awakening from this state of lethargy, their senses were struck with all the delightful objects that have been described, and each perceived himself surrounded by lovely damsels, singing, playing, and attracting his regards by the most fascinating caresses, serving him also with delicate viands and exquisite wines; until intoxicated with excess of enjoyment amidst actual rivulets of milk and wine, he believed himself assuredly in Paradise, and felt an unwillingness to relinquish its delights. When four or five days had thus been passed, they were thrown once more into a state of somnolency, and carried out of the garden. Upon their being introduced to his presence, and questioned by him as to where they had been, their answer was, “In Paradise, through the favor of your highness:” and then before the whole court, who listened to them with eager curiosity and astonishment, they gave a circumstantial account of the scenes to which they had been witnesses. The chief thereupon addressing them, said: “We have the assurances of our prophet that he who defends his lord shall inherit Paradise, and if you show yourselves devoted to the obedience of my orders, that happy lot awaits you.” Animated to enthusiasm by words of this nature, all deemed themselves happy to receive the commands of their master, and were forward to die in his service. 5 The consequence of this system was, that when any of the neighboring princes, or others, gave umbrage to this chief, they were put to death by these his disciplined assassins; none of whom felt terror at the risk of losing their own lives, which they held in little estimation, provided they could execute their master's will.”

However , these methods described by Marco Polo are far from the truth (explained in the below section). It is believed by the Ismailis that the Fida'is were recruited for Jihad as it was a tenet of their faith (like other Muslims) and for their love of the Imam (Walayah).

During the mid-12th century the Assassins captured or acquired several fortresses in the Nusayriyah Mountain Range in coastal Syria, including Masyaf, Rusafa, al-Kahf, al-Qadmus, Khawabi, Sarmin, Quliya, Ulayqa, Maniqa, and Abu Qubays. For the most part, the Assassins maintained full control over these fortresses until 1270–1273 when the Mamluk sultan Baibars annexed them. Most were dismantled afterwards, while those at Masyaf and Ulayqa were later rebuilt. From then on, the Ismailis maintained limited autonomy over those former strongholds as loyal subjects of the Mamluks.

Legends and folklore
The term assassin, which appeared in European languages in a variety of forms (e.g., assassini, assissini, and heyssisini), was evidently based on variants of the Arabic word hashishi (pl. hashishiyya, hashishin). The latter was applied by other Muslims to Nizaris in the pejorative sense of “low-class rabble” or “people of lax morality,” without any derivative explanation reflecting any special connection between the Nizaris and hashish, a product of cannabis. This term of abuse was picked up locally in Syria by the Crusaders and European travelers and adopted as the designation of the Nizari Ismailis. Subsequently, after the etymology of the term had been forgotten, it came to be used in Europe as a noun meaning “murderer.” Thus, a misnomer rooted in abuse eventually resulted in a new word, assassin, in European languages.

Medieval Europeans—and especially the Crusaders—who remained ignorant of Islam as a religion and of its internal divisions were also responsible for fabricating and disseminating (in the Latin Orient as well as in Europe) a number of interconnected legends about the secret practices of the Nizaris, the so-called “assassin legends.” In particular, the legends sought to provide a rational explanation for the seemingly irrational self-sacrificing behavior of the Nizari fida’is; as such, they revolved around the recruitment and training of the youthful devotees. The legends developed in stages from the time of Sinan and throughout the thirteenth century. Soon, the seemingly blind obedience of the fida’is to their leader was attributed, by their occidental observers, to the influence of an intoxicating drug like hashish. There is no evidence that suggests that hashish or any other drug was used in any systematic fashion to motivate the fida’is; contemporary non-Ismaili Muslim sources that are generally hostile toward the Ismailis remain silent on this subject. In all probability, it was the abusive name hashishi that gave rise to the imaginative tales disseminated by the Crusaders.

The work of Farhad Daftary, most notably his The Assassin Legend: Myths of the Ismailis, contends with discrediting these fabrications. The Nizari Ismaili community centered around Alamut and founded by Hassan-i Sabbah engaged in guerilla warfare against their hostile neighbors, the anti-Shi'i Turko-Persian Seljuk Dynasty and the Sunni Caliphate of the Abbasids in Baghdad. Daftary argues that Western and Sunni discourses of the Middle Ages overlooked the intellectual environments and spiritual developments of the Nizari Isma'ilis. As a result, Western and Sunni literature discussing the Nizari Ismailis of the Alamut Period tended to overemphasize this community’s military strategies and its aspirations of overthrowing the Seljuk Dynasty and the Abbasid Caliphates by specifically focusing on the Nizari fida’is. 

The Nizari fida’is utilized the methodology of assassination as a key procedure in killing any major religious and political advisories; however, the fanfare surrounding this policy is not new as the Nizari Isma'ili community was not the first nor the last to make use of this strategy for political gain.  There is evidence to suggest that the Nizar Ismaili fidai’is may have killed “fewer than five Frankish personalities during the entire period of the Crusaders’ presence at Outremer”  which is the name known for the Crusader States of the Levant that lasted from 1098-1291 AD. The spectacle nature of the Nizari fida’is eventually led the term “Assassins” to become synonymous through the writings of Western figures including William of Tyre, Walter Map, and Marco Polo.<ref>Pagès, Meriem, From Martyr to Murderer: Representations of the Assassins in the Twelfth and Thirteenth-Century Europe, 184.</ref>  

Marco Polo’s travelogue entitled the Travels of Marco Polo is the most prominent work to use this trope for embellishing his narrative and providing a more intriguing experience for his readers. These exotic and foreign Nizari figures were often portrayed as incredibly dedicated to their cause and leader known in Western texts as the Old Man. This figure according to the scholarship of Farhad Daftary and Meriem Pages in their contemporary reevaluation refers to Hassan-i Sabbah or Rashid al-Din Sinan, the leader of the Nizari Ismailis in Syria. These fantastic images of the dedicated soldier are often accompanied by descriptions of their supposed usage of hashish, a drug related to cannabis, and their desires to reach a “garden of paradise.”  It is important to note that the usage of hashish is not referenced throughout Ismaili texts of this period. Sunni polemic texts known as “black legends” adopted the terms Hashishiya and malahida to describe their supposed devotion to this drug and their status heretics according to many Sunni Muslim medieval scholars. These fictitious accounts focused on the “sinister objectives, immoral doctrines and libertine practices”  of the Ismaili communities in Syria and Persia and aimed to discredit their devotion to Islam and their connections to Imam Ali through his marriage to Fatima.   

In the light of these findings, this study contends that the Assassin legends, especially those based on the hashish connection and the secret ‘garden of paradise’, were actually fabricated and put into circulation by Europeans. It seems that the occidental observers of the Nizari Ismailis, especially those who were least informed about Islam and the Near East, generated these legends (initially in reference to the Syrian Nizaris) gradually and systematically, adding further components or embellishments in successive stages during the twelfth and thirteenth centuries. In this process, the westerners, who in the Crusaders’ times had a high disposition towards imaginative and romantic eastern tales, were greatly influenced by the biases and the general hostility of the non-Ismaili Muslims towards the Ismailis, hostility which had earlier given rise to the anti-Ismaili ‘black legend’ of the Sunni polemicists as well as some popular misconceptions about the Ismailis.

In all probability, such popular misconceptions also circulated about the Nizaris in the non-literary local circles of the Latin East during the Crusaders’ times; they would have been picked up by the Crusaders through their contact with rural Muslims working on their estates and the lesser educated Muslims of the towns, in addition to whatever information they could gather indirectly through the oriental Christians. In this connection, it is significant to note that similar legends have not been found in any of the mediaeval Islamic sources, including contemporary histories of Syria. Indeed, educated Muslims, including their historians, did not fantasise at all about the secret practices of the Nizaris, even though they were hostile towards them. Similarly, those few well-informed occidental observers of the Syrian Nizaris, such as William of Tyre, who lived in the Latin East for long periods, did not contribute to the formation of the Assassin legends.

In Sum, it seems that the legends in question, though ultimately rooted in some popular lore and misinformation circulating locally, were actually formulated and transmitted rather widely due to their sensational appeal by the Crusaders and other western observers of the Nizaris; and they do, essentially, represent the ‘imaginative constructions’ of these uninformed observers

The legends of the Assassins had much to do with the training and instruction of Nizari fida'is, famed for their public missions during which they often gave their lives to eliminate adversaries. Some historians have contributed to the tales of fida'is being fed with hashish as part of their training, but these are only, in reference, to the travels of Marco Polo and Polemics by enemies. Scholars including Vladimir Ivanov purport that the assassinations of key figures including Seljuk vizier Nizam al-Mulk likely provided encouraging impetus to others in the community who sought to secure the Nizaris' protection from political aggression. Originally, a "local and popular term" first applied to the Isma'ilis of Syria, the label was orally transmitted to Western historians and thus found itself in their histories of the Nizaris.

It is unknown how Hassan-i-Sabbah was able to get the Assassins to perform with such fervent loyalty. One theory, possibly the best known but also the most criticized, comes from the reports of Marco Polo during his travels to the Orient. He recounts a story he heard of a man who would drug his young followers with hashish, lead them to a "paradise", and then claim that only he had the means to allow for their return. Perceiving that Sabbah was either a prophet or magician, his disciples, believing that only he could return them to "paradise", were fully committed to his cause and willing to carry out his every request. However, this story is disputed  because Sabbah died in 1124 and Rashid ad-Din Sinan, who is frequently known as the "Old Man of the Mountain", died in 1192, whereas Marco Polo was not born until around 1254.

The tales of the fida'is training collected from anti-Ismaili historians and orientalist writers were compounded and compiled in Marco Polo's account, in which he described a "secret garden of paradise". After being drugged, the Ismaili devotees were said to be taken to a paradise-like garden filled with attractive young maidens and beautiful plants in which these fida'is would awaken. Here, they were told by an "old" man that they were witnessing their place in Paradise and that should they wish to return to this garden permanently, they must serve the Nizari cause. So went the tale of the "Old Man in the Mountain", assembled by Marco Polo and accepted by Joseph von Hammer-Purgstall, an 18th-century Austrian orientalist writer responsible for much of the spread of this legend. Until the 1930s, von Hammer's retelling of the Assassin legends served as the standard account of the Nizaris across Europe.

A well-known legend tells how Count Henry II of Champagne, returning from Armenia, spoke with Grand Master Rashid ad-Din Sinan at al-Kahf. The count claimed to have the most powerful army and at any moment he claimed he could defeat the Hashashin, because his army was 10 times larger. Rashid replied that his army was instead the most powerful, and to prove it he told one of his men to jump off from the top of the castle in which they were staying. The man did. Surprised, the count immediately recognized that Rashid's army was indeed the strongest, because it did everything at his command, and Rashid further gained the count's respect.

The Ismaili were part of the Durbar of the Moghul Empire, with high-ranking members of their community called Khoja. Their community including the other communities of the Muslims of South Asia had become leaderless after the year 1857 when the Mughal Empire was abolished.

The Ismaili began settling in Bombay when the British Raj had established itself.

Modern works on the Nizaris have elucidated their history and, in doing so, dispelled popular histories from the past as mere legends. In 1933, under the direction of the Imam Sultan Muhammad Shah, Aga Khan III, the Islamic Research Association was developed. Historian Vladimir Ivanov was central to both this institution and the 1946 Ismaili Society of Bombay. Cataloguing a number of Ismaili texts, Ivanov provided the ground for great strides in modern Isma'ili scholarship.

Ismaili leaders would later support the cause of Pakistan during the partition and have a considerable presence in that country.

In recent years, Peter Willey has provided interesting evidence that goes against the Assassin folklore of earlier scholars. Drawing on its established esoteric doctrine, Willey asserts that the Ismaili understanding of Paradise is a deeply symbolic one. While the Qur'anic description of Heaven includes natural imagery, Willey argues that no Nizari fida'i would seriously believe that he was witnessing Paradise simply by awakening in a beauteous garden. The Nizaris' symbolic interpretation of the Qur'anic description of Paradise serves as evidence against the possibility of such an exotic garden used as motivation for the devotees to carry out their armed missions. Furthermore, Willey points out that a courtier of Hulagu Khan, Juvayni, surveyed the Alamut castle just before the Mongol invasion. In his reports about the fortress, there are elaborate descriptions of sophisticated storage facilities and the famous Alamut library. However, even this anti-Ismaili historian makes no mention of the gardens on the Alamut grounds. Having destroyed a number of texts in the library's collection, deemed by Juvayni to be heretical, it would be expected that he would pay significant attention to the Nizari gardens, particularly if they were the site of drug use and temptation. Having not once mentioned such gardens, Willey concludes that there is no sound evidence in favor of these legends.

According to the historian Yaqut al-Hamawi, the Böszörmény, (Izmaleita or Ismaili/Nizari) denomination of Muslims who lived in the Kingdom of Hungary from the 10th to the 13th centuries, were employed as mercenaries by the kings of Hungary. However, following the establishment of the Christian Kingdom of Hungary, their community was vanquished by the end of the 13th century due to the Inquisitions ordered by the Catholic Church during the reign of Coloman, King of Hungary. It is said that the Assassins are the ancestors of those given the surname Hajaly, derived from the word "hajal", a rare species of bird found in the mountains of Syria near Masyaf. The hajal (bird) was often used as a symbol of the Assassin's order.

In popular culture
The Assassins were part of Medieval culture, and they were either demonized or romanticized. The Hashashin frequently appeared in the art and literature of the Middle Ages, sometimes, they were portrayed as one of the knight's archenemies and they were also portrayed as a quintessential villain during the crusades.

The word Assassin, in variant forms, had already passed into European usage as a term for a hired professional murderer in this general sense. The Italian chronicler Giovanni Villani, who died in 1348, tells how the lord of Lucca sent 'his assassins' (i suoi assassini) to Pisa to kill a troublesome enemy there. Even earlier, Dante, in a passing reference in the 19th canto of the Inferno, completed in 1320, speaks of 'the treacherous assassin' (lo perfido assassin); his fourteenth-century commentator Francesco da Buti, explaining a term which for some readers at the time may still have been strange and obscure, remarks: 'Assassino è colui che uccide altrui per danari' (An assassin is one who kills others for money).

The most widespread awareness of the Assassins in modern Europe, and their incorporation into the Romantic tradition, was created by the Austrian historian and Orientalist Joseph von Hammer-Purgstall in his 1818 book, Die Geschichte der Assassinen aus morgenländischen Quellen (translated into English in 1835 as The History of the Assassins). This work was the standard one on the history of the Assassins in the West until the 1930s.

The Assassins appear in many role-playing games and video games, especially in massively multiplayer online games. The assassin character class is a common feature of many such games, usually specializing in single combat and stealth skills, often combined in order to defeat an opponent without exposing the assassin to counter-attack.

 The Exile series of action role-playing games revolves around a time-traveling Syrian Assassin who assassinates various religious historical figures and modern world leaders.
 The Assassin's Creed video game series portrays a heavily fictionalized Ḥashshāshīn order, which has expanded beyond its Levantine confines and is depicted as having existed throughout recorded history (along with their nemesis, the Knights Templar). Both orders are portrayed as fundamentally philosophical orders, rather than religious orders, in nature, and they are expressly said to predate the faiths that their real-life counterparts arose from, thus allowing their respective "histories" to be expanded, both before and after their factual time-frames. In addition, Assassin's Creed draws much of its content from historical facts, and incorporates the purported last words of Hassan i Sabbah as the actual creed ("Nothing is true; everything is permitted"); the sources of that quote are largely unreliable. Since its release, the series has developed into a franchise which consists of novels, comic books, video games, manga, board games, short films and a theatrically released movie.
 In the Sword of Islam DLC for Paradox Interactive's grand strategy game Crusader Kings II, the Hashashin are a holy order associated with Shi'a Islam. Once established, Shi'ite rulers may hire the Hashashin to fight against non-Shi'a realms, and can potentially vassalize them. The Monks and Mystics DLC expands their role, making the Assassins a unique secret society that Shi'a characters may join.
 In the Netflix series Marco Polo, the emperor Kublai Khan is attacked by a group of assassins, the Hashshashin, who are led by the Old Man of the Mountain, according to the Taoist monk Hundred Eyes, in the King's court. The Old Man of the Mountain is then pursued by Marco Polo and Byamba. The episode Hashshashin (2014) shows how the Old Man leads Marco Polo into a hallucinogenic state.
 Louis L'Amour, in his book The Walking Drum, used the assassins and the stronghold of Alamut as the location of his main character's enslaved father. Mathurin Kerbouchard, who initially seeks his father in the 12th-century Moor-controlled Spain, then throughout Europe, must ultimately travel to the Stronghold of Alamut in order to rescue Jean Kerbouchard.
 The Faceless men, a guild of assassins in the book series A Song of Ice and Fire by George R. R. Martin and in the TV series Game of Thrones are inspired by the Order of Assassins
 Dota 2, multiplayer online battle arena contains a character named Lanaya, who is described as a "Templar Assassin".
 The Fate franchise of visual novels features the sect quite prominently with Hassan-i-sabbah, also known as the "Old Man of the Mountain" (Japanese: 山の翁, Yama no Okina), being a pseudonym of 19 wraiths able to be summoned into the assassin class. Their Noble Phantasm is called Zabaniya (in Japanese: ザバーニーヤ), from Arabic (Az-zabānīya: الزبانية), named after the 19 Angels that guard Hell in the Islamic faith. In both Fate/Zero and Fate/stay night: Heaven's Feel, 'Assassin' is a character (servant of Kotomine Kirei and Matō Zouken respectively) that portrays a leader of Hashashins. Hassan-i Sabbah himself features in Fate/Grand Order.
In Batman comics and related media, the League of Assassins is a fictional offshoot of the Order of Assassins that has survived clandestinely into modern times under the immortal DC Comics supervillain Ra's al Ghul.
In the Turkish TV series Uyanış: Büyük Selçuklu, the Order of Assassins and Hassan-i Sabbah are shown as villains who are the enemies of the Seljuk Empire and Malik-Shah I.
The book Angels & Demons by Dan Brown has a modern day descendant of the Hassassin as a major character.
In Umberto Eco's Baudolino, a group of adventurers at the centre of the story are enslaved by the Old Man of the Mountain, being drugged, shown paradise, and serving the order for years before escaping.

See also
 Nizari Ismaili state
 Nizari–Seljuk conflicts
 History of Nizari Ismailism
 List of assassinations by the Assassins
 List of Isma'ili missionaries
 List of the Order of Assassins

Notes

References 
Thatcher, Griffithes Wheeler (1911).  Assassins. Encyclopædia Britannica, 11th Edition, Volume 2, pp. 774–775.
Boyle, John Andrew, Editor (1958), History of the World Conqueror by Ala Ad Din Ata Malik Juvaini, Harvard University Press.

 
 
 
Gibb, N. A. R., Editor (1932) The Damascus Chronicle of the Crusades.  Extracted and translated from the Chronicle of ibn al-Qalānisi,  Luzac & Company, London.
 
 

  (1987 edition available online with registration)
 
 
 
 
Richards, D. S., Editor (2010). The Chronicle of Ibn al-Athir for the Crusading Period from al-Kamil fi’l-Ta’rikh.  Part 1, 1097-1146., Ashgate Publishing, Farnham, UK.
Richards, D. S., Editor (2007), The Chronicle of Ibn al-Athir for the Crusading Period from al-Kamil fi’l-Ta’rikh.  Part 2, 1146-1193, Ashgate Publishing, Farnham, UK.

Further reading 

 
1090 establishments in Asia
Religious organizations established in the 1090s
1275 disestablishments
Religious organizations disestablished in the 13th century
Assassins of the medieval Islamic world
Medieval Syria
Mercenary units and formations of the Middle Ages
Secret societies
Seljuk Empire
Shia Islamist groups
Cannabis and religion
Cannabis and Islam